Witness is a 1985 American neo-noir crime thriller film directed by Peter Weir, and starring Harrison Ford, Kelly McGillis and Lukas Haas, with Jan Rubeš, Danny Glover, Josef Sommer, Alexander Godunov, Patti LuPone and Viggo Mortensen in supporting roles. The film focuses on a police detective (Ford) protecting an Amish woman (McGillis) and her young son (Haas), who becomes a target after he witnesses a brutal murder in a Philadelphia train station.

Filmed in 1984, Witness was released theatrically by Paramount Pictures in February 1985. The film went on to become a sleeper hit, grossing over $116 million worldwide. At the 58th Academy Awards, it earned eight nominations, including Best Picture and Best Actor for Ford, winning Best Original Screenplay and Best Film Editing. It was also nominated for seven BAFTA Awards, winning one for Maurice Jarre's score, and six Golden Globe Awards. William Kelley and Earl W. Wallace won the Writers Guild of America Award for Best Original Screenplay and the 1986 Edgar Award for Best Motion Picture Screenplay presented by the Mystery Writers of America.

Plot
In April 1984, an Amish community outside Lancaster, Pennsylvania, attends the funeral of Jacob Lapp, who leaves behind his wife Rachel and eight-year-old son Samuel. Rachel and Samuel travel by train to visit Rachel's sister, which takes them into Philadelphia. While at 30th Street Station waiting for a connecting train, Samuel goes into the men's room and witnesses the brutal murder of an undercover police officer.

Detective Sergeant John Book and his partner, Sergeant Elton Carter, are assigned to the case. They question Samuel, who is unable to identify the perpetrator from mugshots or a line-up. Samuel then sees a newspaper clipping in a trophy case of officer James McFee receiving an award, and points him out to Book. Book investigates and finds out that McFee was previously responsible for a seizure of expensive chemicals used to make black-market amphetamines, but the evidence has now disappeared. Book surmises that McFee sold the chemicals to drug dealers, and that the murdered detective had been investigating the theft. Book expresses his suspicions to Chief of Police Paul Schaeffer, who advises Book to keep the case secret so they can work out how to proceed. Book is later ambushed and shot in a parking garage by McFee and left badly wounded. Since only Schaeffer knew of Book's suspicions, he realizes Schaeffer is also corrupt and tipped off McFee.

Knowing Samuel and Rachel are now in danger, Book orders his partner to remove all traces of the Lapps from his files, and drives the boy and his mother back to their community where he passes out in front of their farm. Book insists that going to a hospital would allow him to be found and put Samuel in danger. Rachel's father-in-law Eli reluctantly agrees to shelter him.

Book slowly recovers in their care and begins to blend into the community. He and Rachel are also drawn to each other romantically, although they refrain from acting on their feelings. Meanwhile, Schaeffer searches for Book by contacting authorities in the Amish area but, as Amish communities have no modern means of communication and little contact with the outside world, he hits repeated dead ends.

Book eventually goes into town with Eli to use a pay phone to call his precinct, and learns that Carter has been killed. While in town, a group harasses the Amish. Book retaliates, breaking with the Amish tradition of non-violence. The fight is reported to the local police and eventually gets back to Schaeffer.

The next day, Schaeffer, McFee, and another corrupt cop, Ferguson, arrive at the Lapp farm, taking Rachel and Eli hostage. Book tricks Ferguson into the corn silo and suffocates him under tons of corn, then uses Ferguson's shotgun to kill McFee. Schaeffer holds Rachel and Eli at gunpoint but Eli signals to Samuel to ring the farm's bell. Book confronts Schaeffer who threatens to kill Rachel, but the loud bell has summoned their neighbors. As many witnesses were present along with being unwilling to kill a community of pacifists, Schaeffer surrenders and Book arrests him.

Book says goodbye to Samuel in the fields and Eli wishes him well "out there among them English," and Book departs.

Cast

Themes
In his book The Amish in the American Imagination (2001), scholar David Weaver-Zercher notes that Witness is primarily concerned with the intersection of contrasting cultures, a recurring theme in several of Weir's films, including The Last Wave (1977) and The Year of Living Dangerously (1982). Weaver-Zercher notes that the conflict between Amish and non-Amish as depicted in Witness "reflect[s] well on the Amish ways" and also serves as a redemption story for Sergeant Book, who regains a new sense of humanity during his displacement in the Amish community.

Production

Development
Producer Edward S. Feldman, who was in a "first-look" development deal with 20th Century Fox at the time, first received the screenplay for Witness in 1983. Originally entitled Called Home (which is the Amish term for death), it ran for 182 pages, the equivalent of three hours of screen time. The script, which had been circulating in Hollywood for several years, had been inspired by an episode of Gunsmoke William Kelley and Earl W. Wallace had written in the 1970s, which had been based upon an idea by novelist Pamela Wallace.

Feldman liked the concept, but felt too much of the script was devoted to Amish traditions, diluting the thriller aspects of the story. He offered Kelley and Wallace $25,000 for a one-year option and one rewrite, and an additional $225,000 if the film actually were made. They submitted the revised screenplay in less than six weeks, and Feldman delivered it to Fox. Joe Wizan, the studio's head of production, rejected it with the statement that Fox did not make "rural movies".

Feldman sent the screenplay to Harrison Ford's agent Phil Gersh, who contacted the producer four days later and advised him his client was willing to commit to the film. Certain the attachment of a major star would change Wizan's mind, Feldman approached him once again, but Wizan insisted that as much as the studio liked Ford, they still were not interested in making a "rural movie."

Feldman sent the screenplay to numerous studios, and was rejected by all of them, until Paramount Pictures finally expressed interest. Feldman's first choice of director was Peter Weir, but he was involved in preproduction work for The Mosquito Coast and passed on the project. John Badham dismissed it as "just another cop movie", and others Feldman approached either were committed to other projects or had no interest. Then, as financial backing for The Mosquito Coast fell through, Weir became free to direct Witness, which was his first American film. Starting the film immediately was imperative, because a Directors Guild of America strike was looming.

Casting
Lynne Littman had originally been in talks to direct the film, and though she ultimately did not, she recommended Lukas Haas for the part of Samuel because she had recently worked with him on her film Testament. The role of Rachel was the most difficult to cast, and after Weir grew frustrated with the auditions he had seen, he asked the casting director to look for actors in Italy because he thought they would be more "womanly".  As they were reviewing audition tapes from Italy, Kelly McGillis came to audition, and the moment she put on the bonnet and spoke a few lines, Weir knew she was the one. The casting director recommended her old friend Alexander Godunov, who had never acted before, but she thought his personality would be right, and Weir agreed.

Viggo Mortensen was cast because Weir thought he had the right face for the part of an Amish man. Mortensen had just started his acting career, so this was his first film acting role, and he had to turn down another role as a soldier in Shakespeare in the Park's production of Henry V. He credited that decision and the very positive experience on the film as the start of his film career.

Pre-production
During the weeks before filming, Ford spent time with the homicide department of the Philadelphia Police Department, researching the important details of working as a homicide detective. McGillis did research by moving in with an Amish widow and her seven children, learning how to milk cows and practicing their Pennsylvania German dialect.

Weir and cinematographer John Seale went on a trip to the Philadelphia Museum of Art, which was running an exhibition of 17th-century Dutch Masters. Weir drew attention to the paintings of Johannes Vermeer, which were used as inspiration for the lighting and composition of the film, especially in the scenes where John Book is recovering from a gunshot wound in Rachel's house.

Filming
The film was shot on location in Philadelphia and the city and towns of Intercourse, Lancaster, Strasburg, and Parkesburg. Local Amish were willing to work as carpenters and electricians, but declined to appear on film, so many of the extras were actually Mennonites. Halfway through filming, the title was changed from Called Home to Witness at the behest of Paramount's marketing department, which felt the original title posed too much of a promotional challenge. Principal photography was completed three days before the scheduled DGA strike, which ultimately failed to materialize.

During the set-up and rehearsal of each scene, as well as during dailies, Weir would play music to set the mood, with the idea that it prevented the actors from thinking too much and let them listen to their other instincts. The barn-raising scene was only a short paragraph in the script, but Weir thought it was important to highlight that aspect of Amish community life. They shot the scene in a day and did, in fact, build a barn, albeit with the aid of cranes off-camera. To film the scene in the corn silo, corn was actually dropped onto the actor, while a scuba diving regulator with a compressed air tank was hidden on the floor so the actor would be able to breathe.

Originally, the script ended with a scene of Book and Rachel each explaining their feelings for each other to the audience, but Weir felt the scene was unnecessary and decided not to shoot it. The studio executives were concerned that the audience would not understand the conclusion, and tried to convince him otherwise, but Weir insisted that the characters' emotions could be expressed only with visuals.

Release
Witness had its world premiere at the Fulton Opera House in Lancaster, Pennsylvania in on February 7, 1985. The film was screened out of competition at the 1985 Cannes Film Festival.

Box office
The film opened theatrically in 876 theaters in the United States on February 8, 1985, and grossed $4,539,990 in its opening weekend, ranking number two behind Beverly Hills Cop. The film went on to become a sleeper hit, topping the charts in its fifth week of release. It eventually earned a total of $68,706,993 in North America. Internationally, it grossed $47.4 million for a worldwide total of $116.1 million.

Reception

On Rotten Tomatoes, the film holds an approval rating of 93% based on 41 reviews, with an average rating of 8.4/10. The site's critics consensus states: "A wonderfully entertaining thriller within an unusual setting, with Harrison Ford delivering a surprisingly emotive and sympathetic performance." On Metacritic, it has a weighted average score of 76 out of 100 based on 14 critics, indicating "generally favorable reviews".

Roger Ebert of the Chicago Sun-Times rated the film four out of four stars, calling it:  Ebert also praised Ford's work and claimed he had "never given a better performance in a movie."

Vincent Canby of The New York Times:

Variety said the film was "at times a gentle, affecting story of star-crossed lovers limited within the fascinating Amish community. Too often, however, this fragile romance is crushed by a thoroughly absurd shoot-'em-up, like ketchup poured over a delicate Pennsylvania Dutch dinner."

Time Out New York observed, "Powerful, assured, full of beautiful imagery and thankfully devoid of easy moralizing, it also offers a performance of surprising skill and sensitivity from Ford."

Halliwell's Film Guide chose Witness as one of only two films from 1985 to receive a four-star review, describing it as "one of those lucky movies which works out well on all counts and shows that there are still craftsmen lurking in Hollywood."

Radio Times called the film "partly a love story and partly a thriller, but mainly a study of cultural collision – it's as if the world of Dirty Harry had suddenly stumbled into a canvas by Brueghel." It added, "[I]t's Weir's delicacy of touch that impresses the most. He ably juggles the various elements of the story and makes the violence seem even more shocking when it's played out on the fields of Amish denial."

Accolades

Controversy
Leading up to and following its release, Witness was met with controversy from the Amish communities where it was filmed, and was subject to debate from editors, scholars, and other parties regarding its depiction of the Amish. Some accused the film of exploiting the Amish community for commercial purposes, while others felt that the depiction of Amish characters in an R-rated film featuring graphic violence was insensitive to the Amish's beliefs.

A statement released by a law firm associated with the Amish claimed that their portrayal in the movie was not accurate. The National Committee For Amish Religious Freedom called for a boycott of the movie soon after its release, citing fears that these communities were being "overrun by tourists" as a result of the popularity of the movie, and worried that "the crowding, souvenir-hunting, photographing and trespassing on Amish farmsteads will increase." After the movie was completed, Pennsylvania governor Dick Thornburgh agreed not to promote Amish communities as future film sites. A similar concern was voiced within the movie itself, where Rachel tells a recovering Book that tourists often consider her fellow Amish something to stare at, with some even being so rude as to trespass on their private property.

Legacy
Negotiation expert William Ury summarised the film's climactic scene in a chapter titled "The Witness" in his 1999 book Getting to Peace (later republished with the alternative title The Third Side: Why We Fight and How We Can Stop) and used the scene as a symbol of the power of ordinary citizens to resolve conflicts and stop violence.

Japanese filmmaker Akira Kurosawa cited Witness as one of his favorite films of all time.

References

Sources

Further reading
 Wahlbrinck, Bernd. WITNESS Revisited: An Appreciation of Peter Weir's Famous Film, Tumbleweed 2020, 
 Kelley, William and Earl W. Wallace (based on the screenplay by Earl W. Wallace and William Kelley). Witness, Pocket Books; Media Tie In, 1985

External links

 
 
 
 
 
 

1985 films
1985 crime drama films
American crime drama films
American neo-noir films
American police detective films
American thriller films
Amish in films
Anthony Award-winning works
Edgar Award-winning works
Fictional portrayals of the Philadelphia Police Department
Films scored by Maurice Jarre
Films about families
Films about grieving
Films about murder
Films about witness protection
Films directed by Peter Weir
Films produced by Edward S. Feldman
Films set in 1984
Films set in Pennsylvania
Films set in Philadelphia
Films shot in Philadelphia
Films about police misconduct
Films whose editor won the Best Film Editing Academy Award
Films whose writer won the Best Original Screenplay Academy Award
Films about mother–son relationships
Paramount Pictures films
Rail transport films
1980s American films